For administrative purposes, the city of Bangalore was divided into nine zones, which are further subdivided into a total of 198 wards administered by the Bruhat Bengaluru Mahanagara Palike.

See also
 1996 Bangalore Municipal Corporation election
 2001 Bangalore Municipal Corporation election
 List of wards in Bangalore
 List of wards in Bangalore (2010-2020)
 List of wards in Bangalore (1989-1995)

References

External links
 Bruhat Bengaluru Mahanagara Palike ward information
 Bruhat Bengaluru Mahanagara Palike wards list
 Bruhat Bengaluru Mahanagara Palike Wards Mapview OpenCity

Bangalore-related lists
Municipal wards of Bangalore